IWPS may refer to:

Institute of War and Peace Studies, an American research center created in 1951 until a name alteration in 2003
Inland Waterways Protection Society, a British organisation founded in 1958 to work for the restoration of the canal system
Individual World Poetry Slam, an annual poetry slam tournament held since 2004
The International Women’s Peace Service